Tintinnabularia is a genus of flowering plants in the family Apocynaceae, first described for modern science as a genus in 1936. It is native to S Mexico, Guatemala, and Honduras.

Species
 Tintinnabularia gratissima J.F.Morales - Veracruz
 Tintinnabularia mortonii Woodson - Oaxaca, Chiapas, Guatemala
 Tintinnabularia murallensis J.K.Williams - Honduras

References

Apocynaceae genera
Mesechiteae